Trinity United Methodist Church is a historic Methodist church building located near Ellett, Montgomery County, Virginia.  It was built between 1908 and 1910, and is a one-story, four-bay, nave plan brick structure. It has a two-stage corner tower, containing a vestibule at the northwest corner. The second stage of the tower takes the form of an open belfry with sawn brackets supporting a conical cap with finial. A Sunday school wing added in 1961.

It was listed on the National Register of Historic Places in 1989.

References

United Methodist churches in Virginia
Churches on the National Register of Historic Places in Virginia
Churches completed in 1910
Churches in Montgomery County, Virginia
National Register of Historic Places in Montgomery County, Virginia